Arapeí is a Brazilian municipality of the eastern part of the state of São Paulo. It is part of the Metropolitan Region of Vale do Paraíba e Litoral Norte. The population is 2,460 (2020 est.) in an area of 156.90 km². Its bordering cities are Resende and Barra Mansa (both in the state of Rio de Janeiro) in the north, Bananal in the southeast and São José do Barreiro in the west.

References

Municipalities in São Paulo (state)